"I Was a Lover, a Leader of Men" is a single released in November 1965, recorded by the Bee Gees, written by Barry Gibb. The song was backed with "And the Children Laughing". However, it was released in the Philippines in January 1966. It is also the first track of the Bee Gees' first album, The Bee Gees Sing and Play 14 Barry Gibb Songs. This song won Barry a song-writing award.

Chart performance
The song reached number 85 in Australia.

Personnel
Barry Gibb – lead vocals, rhythm guitar
Robin Gibb – harmony and backing vocals
Maurice Gibb – harmony and backing vocals, 12-string lead guitar
Uncredited musicians – drums, piano

References

1965 singles
1965 songs
Bee Gees songs
Songs written by Barry Gibb
British folk rock songs